Frances M. Palacios is Utah’s first Hispanic American female judge. 

She earned her political science degree from Weber State University (1977) and Juris Doctor from the University of Utah Law School (1980). On October 9, 1980, Palacios was admitted to practice law in the state. During the 1980s, she was employed at the Salt Lake Legal Defenders Association as a court-appointed trial attorney. In 1992, she became the first Hispanic female judge upon being appointed as a Commissioner of the Third District Court.

See also 

 List of first women lawyers and judges in Utah
 List of Hispanic/Latino American jurists

References 

Utah lawyers
American women lawyers
Weber State University alumni
University of Utah alumni
Year of birth missing (living people)
Living people
21st-century American women
Hispanic and Latino American judges